Mastax humilis is a species of beetle in the family Carabidae with restricted distribution in the Indonesia.

References

Mastax humilis
Beetles described in 1936
Beetles of Asia